Oliver Augustus Sparre Klitten (born 1 May 2000) is a Danish professional footballer who plays as a left winger for FC Helsingør, on loan from AaB.

Club career

AaB
Klitten had his first experience AaB's first-team squad on 29 April 2018, where he was on the bench against FC Midtjylland in the Danish Superliga. In January 2019, Klitten was a part of first team squad, that went to Turkey on a training camp. On 26 April 2019, he made his debut for AaB, coming off the bench with two minutes remaining against Hobro IK.

Klitten and his twin brother, Lukas, were promoted to the first team squad for the 2019–20 season.

Loan spells
On 1 October 2020, Klitten was loaned out to Norwegian club FK Haugesund until the end of 2021. However, after only 92 minutes of playing time spread over 5 matches, the loan deal was terminated on 31 December 2020 and Klitten returned to AaB.

In order to gain playing time, Klitten was loaned out to Danish 1st Division club Hobro IK on 22 July 2021, for the 2021–22 season. After returning from Hobro, Klitten was once again loaned out; this time to FC Helsingør until the end of the 2022-23 season, where his contract with AaB also would expire.

Personal life
Lukas has a twin brother, Lukas Klitten, who also is a football player.

References

External links
 
 Oliver Klitten at DBU

2000 births
Living people
Sportspeople from Aalborg
Association football wingers
Danish men's footballers
Danish expatriate men's footballers
Danish twins
Twin sportspeople
Denmark youth international footballers
AaB Fodbold players
FK Haugesund players
Hobro IK players
FC Helsingør players
Danish Superliga players
Eliteserien players
Danish 1st Division players
Danish expatriate sportspeople in Norway
Expatriate footballers in Norway